Ibrahim ibn Yaqub ( Ibrâhîm ibn Ya'qûb al-Ṭarṭûshi or al-Ṭurṭûshî; , Avraham ben Yaʿakov;  961–62) was a tenth-century Hispano-Arabic, Sephardi Jewish traveler, probably a merchant, who may have also engaged in diplomacy and espionage. His travelogue, Kitab al-Istibsar includes descriptions of various cities and regions as well as accounts of the customs and daily life of the people he encountered on his travels.

Biography 
His family hailed from Moorish-ruled Ṭurṭūšah (now Tortosa) close to the mouth of the Ebro: he may also have lived in Córdoba. Written and oral history and his writings suggest that he had a Jewish background. However, it has also been argued by other historians that he was a Muslim of Jewish background, and Bernard Lewis states: "There is some uncertainty to whether he was a professing Jew or a Muslim of Jewish origin."

In 961–62 he travelled in Western and Central Europe and in Italy at least as far as Rome, where he was received with an audience with the Holy Roman Emperor Otto I during the first week of February.

Nothing is known about his return to al-Andalus (the Muslim-ruled part of the Iberian Peninsula), nor of any further travel. The memoirs and commentaries of his journey, possibly first presented to the Cordoban caliph Al-Hakam II (961–76), have been lost; only excerpts by later authors have been preserved, principally Abu Abdullah al-Bakri's Book of Highways and of Kingdoms and the work of Zakariya al-Qazwini, possibly via the writings of Al-Udri.

His work is widely known as providing the first reliable description of the Polish state under Mieszko I, the first historical ruler of Poland. He is also noted for his description of the Vikings living in Hedeby; of the Nakonid fortification at Mecklenburg Castle; and of what was, in all likelihood, the nucleus of the later ducal castle and palace at Schwerin. Ibrahim ibn Yaqub has a unique place in Czech history as the first person to mention the city of Prague and its Jewish community in writing. He also mentioned Czech Boleslaus I, Duke of Bohemia and Krakow as part of Duchy of Bohemia.

See also
Vineta
At-Turtushi
Benjamin of Tudela

Bibliography
"Ibrāhīm ibn Ya‛qūb al-Isrā’īlī al-Ṭurṭūshī," by Lutz Richter-Bernburg, in: The Oxford Companion to World Exploration, David Buisseret, editor-in-chief, 2 vols., Oxford UP 2007, I:402b-403b

References

External links

Ibrahim ibn Jakub i Tadeusz Kowalski w sześćdziesiątą rocznicę edycji, ed. Andrzej Zaborski, Kraków 2008

10th-century Jews from al-Andalus
10th-century businesspeople
10th-century historians from al-Andalus
Ancient geographers
Jewish explorers
Jewish historians
Medieval Jewish travel writers

Year of birth unknown
Year of death unknown
10th-century explorers